Isabella Isaksen (born November 20, 1993) is a modern pentathlete from the United States who competed at the 2016 Summer Olympics in Rio de Janeiro, Brazil.

Isaksen is the younger sister of Margaux Isaksen, who competed in the 2008 and 2012 Olympics, and competed in 2016. Isabella trains with Margaux at the Olympic Training Center in Colorado Springs. Isaksen qualified for the 2016 Olympics after the re-allocation of unused quota places on June 16, 2016.

Isaksen is married to the Egyptian-born American Olympic modern pentathlete Amro El Geziry.

Early life 

Isaksen was born in Fayetteville, Arkansas. She has one sibling, older sister Margaux Isaksen, who made the United States Olympic Team in modern pentathlon in 2008, 2012, and 2016. Isaksen's father was the captain of a cruise ship. He died of colon cancer when his daughters were 2 and 6 months old, respectively.

Isabella actually took up fencing before her older sister Margaux did. Isabella was a fencer first, before taking up modern pentathlon, of which fencing is one of the five components.

References

External links

 USA Pentathlon profile

1993 births
Living people
American female modern pentathletes
Modern pentathletes at the 2016 Summer Olympics
Olympic modern pentathletes of the United States
Sportspeople from Fayetteville, Arkansas
Modern pentathletes at the 2019 Pan American Games
Pan American Games medalists in modern pentathlon
Pan American Games gold medalists for the United States
Medalists at the 2019 Pan American Games
21st-century American women
20th-century American women